Opuksky Nature Reserve is a protected nature reserve located on the southern coast of the Kerch Peninsula on the Black Sea.   It is centered on a limestone massif (Mount Opuk) rising from the kerch plains, and a salt lake (Lake Koyashske).  The site is a Ramsar Wetland of International Importance.

Topography
The site is 30 km southwest of the city of kerch, on the south coast.  Opuk Mountain in the reserve is the highest point on the Kerch Peninsula, at 185 meters above sea level.  It is a table mountain composed of reef limestone, as is much of the karst landscape and offshore islands surrounding it.  This distinguishes the reserve from the plains of the Kerch Peninsula around it.  To the west of Mount Opuk is a Lake Koyashske, a shallow salt lake, and the larger Uzunlarske Lake. The coastal terrain also features sandy-coquina spits.

Climate and ecoregion

The reserve is located in the Pontic–Caspian steppe ecoregion, a region that covers an expanse of grasslands stretching from the northern shores of the Black Sea to western Kazakhstan.

Flora and fauna
The higher ground exhibits plants of coastal steppe varieties, the sandy spits support Crambe and other species endemic to the Crimean Peninsula.  The reserve is important of it support of birds, with over 200 species having been recorded on the site.

Public use
As a strict nature reserve, Opuksky's primary purpose is protection of nature and scientific study.  Public access is limited: mass recreation and construction of facilities is prohibited as are hunting and fishing.  There are three ecological trails on which employees of the reserve conduct guided educational tours.

See also
 Lists of Nature Preserves of Ukraine (class Ia protected areas)
 National Parks of Ukraine (class II protected areas)

References

External links
 Boundaries of Opuksky Nature Reserve on OpenStreetMap.org 

Protected areas of Ukraine
Nature reserves in Ukraine